Paisios Ligarides, born  Pantaleon Ligarides (Latinized Ligaridus; c.1610 – 1678) was Greek Orthodox scholar and Bishop of the Church of Jerusalem; Orthodox Metropolitan of Gaza.

Born in Chios, he taught literature and theology in the Greek college in Rome established in 1577 by Pope Gregory XIII. He was at first supportive of reconciliation of Orthodox with Catholic theology, but later returned to 
Greek Orthodoxy and wrote against both Catholicism and Calvinism.
Leaving Rome, he went to Constantinople, and later (1646) to Târgoviște in Wallachia where he established (or revived) a Greek school.
In 1651 he travelled to Palestine in the company of patriarch Paisius of Jerusalem, taking monastic vows and adopting the monastic name of Paisius. In 1652, he received the titular office of Metropolitan of Gaza from Paisius.

In 1655, he wrote a very long Chrismology [Chrismologion] of Constantinople, the New Rome, the first comprehensive collection of the mass of Greek oracular and prophetic produced in reference to the Fall of Constantinople .

Paisios Ligarides is known as a trader of indulgences, which he sold in Russia.

References

Bibliography
Constantine Sathas,  Νεοελληνική Φιλολογία: Βιογραφία των εν τοις γράμμασι διαλαμψάντων Ελλήνων (1453-1821) Athens (1868), 814–816.
Andronikos Dimitrakopoulos, Ορθόδοξος Ελλάς (1872), 161f.
 
V. Grumel, "Ligaridès, Paisios" in: Dictionnaire de Theologie Catholique, Paris (1930–1950) vol. IX, 749–757.
Gerhard Podskalsky, Griechische Theologie in der Zeit der Türkenherrschaft (1453-1821) (1988), 251ff.
Harry T. Hionides, Paisius Ligarides (1972).

17th-century people from the Ottoman Empire
1610 births
1678 deaths
Clergy from Chios
17th-century Greek clergy
Eastern Orthodox theologians
Catholic–Eastern Orthodox ecumenism
Year of birth uncertain
Writers from Chios
17th-century Greek writers
17th-century Greek educators
Pontifical Greek College of Saint Athanasius alumni